Sabino is an unincorporated community in Quitman County, Mississippi. Sabino is east of Clarksdale and west of Lambert.

References

Unincorporated communities in Quitman County, Mississippi
Unincorporated communities in Mississippi